Tiffany Villarreal  is an American R&B singer of Mexican and Puerto Rican descent from San Antonio, Texas, United States. She sang vocals on Baby Bash's "Shorty DooWop", as well as "The Hood" by Raekwon and "In the Ayer" by Flo Rida. She released her self-titled debut album in 2004, only in Japan. The album features guests like Raekwon and Sheek Louch.

Career
In 1996, she briefly joined R&B girl group 702 along with Kameelah Williams as replacements for original members Orish Grinstead and Amelia Cruz, Tiffany later departed the group for a solo career and signed to RCA Records. Missy Elliott was enlisted as the executive producer for her debut. However, due to the folding of RCA, Villarreal's debut album was shelved. Following her leave from RCA, Villarreal signed to Pharrell Williams' Star Trak Entertainment as one-third member of the Latina group Affair with Natasha Ramos and Vanessa Marquez. She had also signed to Dr. Dre's Aftermath Entertainment imprint. However, she later left to sign with Motown Records. Again, she moved, this time for a deal with Raekwon's Rae Records and Virgin Records.

Discography
Studio albums
Tiffany Villarreal (2004)

Other appearances
Back To Me – Fantasia – "Trust Him" (writing credits)
Until the end of Time – Tupac Shakur – "Fuck Friendz" (featured artist)
Mail On Sunday – Flo Rida – "In The Ayer" (background vocals)
The Lex Diamond Story – Raekwon – "The Hood" (featured artist)
Tha Smokin' Nephew – Baby Bash – "Shorty Doowop" (featured artist)

Tiffany Villarreal (2004)

Track listing 
  "The Real Intro"
  "Fire"
  "Rewind the Time" (feat. Raekwon)
  "You, Yourself & You"
  "Erotic Interlude"
  "Erotic"
  "Go to Work"
  "Holla at Me "
  "For My Girls"
  "Better Woman"
  "Us"
  "Set You Free"
  "Silent Gun" (feat. Sheek Louch) *
  "Nine Months" *

* – Indicates Japanese version only bonus tracks

References

Year of birth missing (living people)
Living people
Musicians from San Antonio
Singers from Texas
American musicians of Mexican descent
American people of Puerto Rican descent